Brezovec pri Polju is a settlement in the Municipality of Podčetrtek in eastern Slovenia. The area around Podčetrtek is part of the traditional region of Styria. It is now included in the Savinja Statistical Region.

Name
The name of the settlement was changed from Brezovec to Brezovec pri Polju in 1953.

References

External links
Brezovec pri Polju on Geopedia

Populated places in the Municipality of Podčetrtek